Mitscherlich is a Germanic surname which may refer to:

Alexander Mitscherlich (chemist) (1836–1918), a German chemist
Alexander Mitscherlich (psychologist) (1908–1982), a German psychiatrist
Andrea Ehrig-Mitscherlich (born 1 December 1960), a former German speed skater
Christoph Wilhelm Mitscherlich (1760–1854), a German classical scholar 
Eilhard Mitscherlich (1794–1863), a German chemist
Immeke Mitscherlich (1899–1985), German textile artist
Margarete Mitscherlich-Nielsen (1917–2012), psychoanalyst 
Thomas Mitscherlich (1942–1998), a German film director and screenwriter